Elachista levasi is a moth of the family Elachistidae. It is found in Turkmenistan.

The wingspan is about 8.6 mm for males. The forewings are white and spotless, while the underside is brownish. The upperside of the hindwings is white, while the underside is light beige. Adults have been recorded in mid-June.

Etymology
The species is named in honour of Mr. Levas Saulius Brazionis.

References

levasi
Moths described in 1998
Moths of Asia